Fazenda Nova is a municipality in central-west Goiás state, Brazil.

Location
Fazenda Nova is located northwest of the state capital, Goiânia, which is 206 km. away taking highways GO-418 and GO-060.  Fazenda Nova belongs to the Iporá Microregion.

Municipal boundaries are with:
Buriti de Goiás, Córrego do Ouro, Israelândia, Jaupaci, Jussara, Montes Claros de Goiás and Novo Brasil.

Districts, villages, and hamlets
Districts: Bacilândia and Serra Dourada.
Villages: Iapiruara e São Sebastião do Indaia.
Hamlet: Três Marcos.

Demographics
Population in 1980: 9.887
Population in 2007: 6.373
Urban population: 4.257
Rural population: 2.116
Population growth rate:   -1.50% 1996/2007

The economy
The main economic activities were agriculture, cattle raising, and milk production.  There was one banking institution—Banco do Brasil S.A (08/2007) and one dairy—Laticínios Morrinhos Ind. e Com. Ltda.; - Coop. Prod. de Leite da Regional de Fazenda Nova (2007).  In 2006 there were 116,000 head of cattle.  Agricultural production was modest with main crops being corn, soybeans, manioc, hearts of palm, and bananas.
 GDP (PIB) (R$1,000.00):  54,904 (2005)
 GDP per capita (R$1.00):  7,790 (2005)

Motor vehicles
Automobiles: 414
Pickup trucks:  90
Number of inhabitants per motor vehicle: 13

Agricultural data 2006
Farms:  873
Total area:  116,273 ha.
Area of permanent crops: 189 ha.
Area of perennial crops: 1,379 ha.
Area of natural pasture:  87,951 ha.
Area of woodland and forests:  26,811 ha.
Persons dependent on farming:  2,500
Farms with tractors: 62
Number of tractors:  78
Cattle herd:  116,000 head

Health and education
In 2000 the literacy rate was 84.1% while the infant mortality rate was 18.35 in 1,000 live births.  There were 11 schools with 1,610 students in 2006, while there was one hospital with 28 beds in 2007.  The Municipal Human Development Index was 0.746, which was ranked 89 in the state.

History
The history of Fazenda Nova begins in 1945 on the Tres Ilhas cattle ranch owned by José de Paula Barbosa.  The first settlement took the name of Paulápolis to honor its founder.  Its rapid economic development made it pass from the category of "povoado" (village) directly to that of municipality in 1953.

See also
List of municipalities in Goiás
Microregions of Goiás

References

Frigoletto

Municipalities in Goiás